Victor Coverley-Price (31 January 1901 – 1 October 1988) was a British painter. His work was part of the painting event in the art competition at the 1948 Summer Olympics.

References

1901 births
1988 deaths
20th-century British painters
British male painters
Olympic competitors in art competitions
Artists from Winchester
20th-century British male artists